The 2010 FIBA Europe Under-16 Championship for Women Division B was the 7th edition of the Division B of the European basketball championship for women's national under-16 teams. It was played in Skopje, Republic of Macedonia, from 12 to 22 August 2010. Hungary women's national under-16 basketball team won the tournament.

Participating teams

  (16th place, 2009 FIBA Europe Under-16 Championship for Women Division A)
  (15th place, 2009 FIBA Europe Under-16 Championship for Women Division A)

First round
In the first round, the teams were drawn into four groups of four. The first three teams from each group will advance to the second round (Groups E and F) and the last teams will advance to the 13th–16th place classification (Group G).

Group A

Group B

Group C

Group D

Second round
In the second round, the teams play in two groups of six. The first four teams from each group will advance to the Quarterfinals and the other teams will advance to the 9th–12th place playoffs.

Group E

Group F

13th–16th place classification

Group G

9th–12th place playoffs

Championship playoffs

Final standings

References

2010
2010–11 in European women's basketball
International youth basketball competitions hosted by North Macedonia
FIBA U16
August 2010 sports events in Europe